Cobananthus is a genus of flowering plants in the family Gesneriaceae, with a single species Cobananthus calochlamys. It is sometimes included in the genus Alloplectus, but molecular phylogenetic studies suggest that the two genera are not closely related, with Cobananthus more closely related to Alsobia.

References

Gesneriaceae genera
Monotypic Lamiales genera
Gesnerioideae